The Aeronca E-107 was one of the first low-cost reliable engines of the post-World War I era.

Design and development

The E-107A was a production aviation flathead engine designed to replace a Morehouse engine on the first prototype of the Aeronca C-2. The first five were produced without cooling fins on the crankcase, but with all versions having air-cooling fins atop the cylinder heads, similar to many air-cooled two-stroke engines in appearance. A Winfleld Model 5 carburetor was standard for the engine. The E-107 was replaced by the uprated, overhead valvetrain E-113 engine based on the same design.

Variants
E-107Standard production engine
E-107AThe E-107A was produced for Aeronca by the Govro-Nelson Company of Detroit, Michigan.
O-107Designation given to engines fitted to impressed aircraft

Applications
Aeronca C-2
Pickering-Pearson KP.2

Engines on display
 An E-107 is on display at the EAA Airventure Museum in Oshkosh, Wisconsin
 The restored first prototype Aeronca C-2 (registration NC 626N) fitted with an E-107 is on display at the Udvar-Hazy building of the Smithsonian's National Air and Space Museum.

Specifications (E-107)

See also

References

1920s aircraft piston engines
Boxer engines